Maximilian Sean Walsh  (8 May 1937 – 23 March 2022) was an Australian economic and political commentator, journalist, author and broadcaster. Walsh held senior positions with two of Australia's largest publishing companies and television networks.

Career
From 1974 to 1981, Walsh was editor and managing editor of The Australian Financial Review before establishing Nine Network's Sunday program. He then became co-presenter of The Carleton-Walsh Report on ABC Television, before moving to Network Ten as presenter of The Walsh Report.

From 1983 to 1998 he was a columnist and correspondent with The Sydney Morning Herald and The Age. In 1998, he became editor-in-chief of The Bulletin. He worked at The Bulletin until his retirement as the editor-at-large in June 2007.

Board positions
Walsh was deputy chairman of financial advisory firm Dixon Advisory and a member of the firm's investment committee.

Walsh was chairman of the Australian Masters Corporate Bond Fund No. 1, Australian Masters Corporate Bond Fund No. 2, Australian Masters Corporate Bond Fund No. 3, Australian Masters Corporate Bond Fund No. 4 and Australian Masters Corporate Bond Fund No. 5. He was also non-executive chairman of the Global Resource Masters Fund and the Asian Masters Fund and a director of the Australian Governance Masters Fund.

Awards
In 1984, Walsh was made a member of the Order of Australia for his services to journalism.

Author
Walsh is author of the book, "Poor Little Rich Country – A political History of the 1970s".

Death
Walsh died on 23 March 2022 after a long struggle with dementia.

References

External links
Walsh & Company – global fund manager founded by Walsh

1937 births
2022 deaths
Australian journalists
Australian business executives
University of Sydney alumni
Members of the Order of Australia
The Sydney Morning Herald people
People from New South Wales
Deaths from dementia